Nagle College is an independent Roman Catholic co-educational secondary day school located in Bairnsdale in the East Gippsland region of Victoria, Australia.

Background and location
Nagle College was established in 1958 to provide a Catholic secondary education for the families in the parishes of East Gippsland. The College was founded by the Presentation Sisters who provided the leadership of the College until 1975. The school is named after the Sisters' patron, The Venerable Nano Nagle. Rod Nicholson was Principal from 1976 until 1988. The Salesians of Don Bosco took responsibility for the College in 1990.

The school began in Francis Street and moved to a site on the western edge of the town in 1979.

Uniform
The winter uniform consists of dress shirts, tie and pants or skirt. The summer uniform consists of a dress for girls, and a shirt and shorts for boys. Juniors (year level 7–9) wear yellow shirts and seniors (year level 10–12) wear a white dress shirt. Seniors also wear a blazer and juniors have the option to wear a jumper or a spray jacket.

The sport uniform (for sports classes) consists of a shirt of the house color (see below) and shorts or leggings.

House system
There are seven different houses that exist at Nagle College. Bosco house is the newest house, added in the late 1990s when student numbers increased.

The houses are as follows:

  Avila House (yellow) - Teresa of Ávila Patron
  Bosco House (white) - John Bosco Patron
  Chisholm House (magenta) - Caroline Chisholm
  MacKillop House (orange)(originally brown) - Mary MacKillop Patron
  Newman House (red) - John Henry Newman Patron
  Polding House (blue) - Bede Polding Patron
  Xavier House (green) - Francis Xavier Patron

Music department
Music is compulsory in years 7 and 8. Students can decide do continue the subject or not.

Nagle College has several different bands and performance groups, including: choir, strings band (Tunes), show band (Cookies & Cream), percussion ensemble (Beat It!), next generation band, and junior and senior guitar ensemble.

Languages
Students at Nagle College can decide whether they wish to learn either Italian or Japanese. It is compulsory in the first two years of school, but in year 9 students may choose whether they wish to continue or not.

The school has multiple exchange programs, with students travelling to Japan and Italy once a year if they choose to. The school also has connections to a school in Samoa and multiple others around the world.

Practical subjects
Students at Nagle College are exposed to many practical subjects as well as non-practical including: Woodwork, Sewing, Cooking, Metalwork (for later years), animal care (for later years), PE, Art, Drama, Photography and many more.

Woodwork, Sewing, Art, Drama and Cooking is compulsory in year 7 and 8.

See also

List of non-government schools in Victoria, Australia

References

Catholic secondary schools in Victoria (Australia)
Bairnsdale
1958 establishments in Australia
Educational institutions established in 1958